Olivier Caillas (born 2 December 1977) is a German football manager and former player.

Personal life
Caillas was born in Homburg, Saarland. From 2009, he studied Business economics in distance learning at the EFH Hamburg.

References

External links
 

1977 births
Living people
German footballers
Association football midfielders
FC 08 Homburg players
1. FC Saarbrücken players
Alemannia Aachen players
SpVgg Greuther Fürth players
Grenoble Foot 38 players
SV Wehen Wiesbaden players
Fortuna Düsseldorf players
FC Rot-Weiß Erfurt players
2. Bundesliga players
3. Liga players
Regionalliga players
People from Homburg, Saarland
Footballers from Saarland